Elnardo Webster may refer to:

Elnardo Webster (American football) (born 1969), American football player
Elnardo Webster (basketball) (1948–2022), American basketball player